MayaVi is a scientific data visualizer written in Python, which uses VTK and provides a GUI via Tkinter. MayaVi was developed by Prabhu Ramachandran, is free and distributed under the BSD License. It is cross-platform and runs on any platform where both Python and VTK are available (almost any Unix, Mac OS X, or Windows). MayaVi is pronounced as a single name, "Ma-ya-vee", meaning "magical" in Sanskrit. The code of MayaVi has nothing in common with that of Autodesk Maya or the Vi text editor.

The latest version of MayaVi, called Mayavi2, is a component of the Enthought suite of scientific Python programs. It differs from the original MayaVi by its strong focus on making not only an interactive program, but also a reusable component for 3D plotting in Python. Although it exposes a slightly different interface and API than the original MayaVi, it now has more features.

Major features
 visualizes computational grids and scalar, vector, and tensor data
 an easy-to-use GUI
 can be imported as a Python module from other Python programs or can be scripted from the Python interpreter
 supports volume visualization of data via texture and ray cast mappers
 support for any VTK dataset using the VTK data format
 support for PLOT3D data
 multiple datasets can be used simultaneously
 provides a pipeline browser, with which objects in the VTK pipeline can be browsed and edited
 imports simple VRML and 3D Studio scenes
 custom modules and data filters can be added
 exporting to PostScript files, PPM/BMP/TIFF/JPEG/PNG images, Open Inventor, Geomview OOGL, VRML files, Wavefront .obj files, or RenderMan RIB file

Examples

Spherical harmonics

from numpy import linspace, meshgrid, array, sin, cos, pi, abs
from scipy.special import sph_harm
from mayavi import mlab

theta_1d = linspace(0,   pi,  91) 
phi_1d   = linspace(0, 2*pi, 181)

theta_2d, phi_2d = meshgrid(theta_1d, phi_1d)
xyz_2d = array([sin(theta_2d) * sin(phi_2d),
                sin(theta_2d) * cos(phi_2d),
                cos(theta_2d)]) 
l = 3
m = 0

Y_lm = sph_harm(m, l, phi_2d, theta_2d)
r = abs(Y_lm.real) * xyz_2d

mlab.figure(size=(700, 830))
mlab.mesh(r[0], r[1], r[2], scalars=Y_lm.real, colormap="cool")
mlab.view(azimuth=0, elevation=75, distance=2.4, roll=-50)
mlab.savefig("Y_%i_%i.jpg" % (l, m))
mlab.show()

References

External links
 
 

Free data visualization software
Free plotting software
Free software programmed in Python
Plotting software
Software that uses Tk (software)
Software that uses VTK